Black-and-white colobuses (or colobi) are Old World monkeys of the genus Colobus, native to Africa. They are closely related to the red colobus monkeys of genus Piliocolobus. There are five species of this monkey, and at least eight subspecies. They are generally found in high-density forests where they forage on leaves, flowers and fruit. Social groups of colobus are diverse, varying from group to group. Resident-egalitarian and allomothering relationships have been observed among the female population. Complex behaviours have also been observed in this species, including greeting rituals and varying group sleeping patterns. Colobi play a significant role in seed dispersal.

Etymology
The word "colobus" comes from Greek  (kolobós, "docked", "maimed"), so named because the thumb is stump-like.

Taxonomy

Genus Colobus 
Black colobus, C. satanas
Gabon black colobus, C. s. anthracinus
Bioko black colobus, C. s. satanas
Angola colobus, C. angolensis
Sclater's Angola colobus, C. a. angolensis
Powell-Cotton's Angola colobus, C. a. cottoni
Adolf Friedrichs's Angola colobus, or Ruwenzori black-and-white colobus, C. a. ruwenzorii
Cordier's Angola colobus, C. a. cordieri
Prigogine's Angola colobus, C. a. prigoginei
Peters's Angola colobus or Tanzanian black-and-white colobus, C. a. palliatus
King colobus, C. polykomos
Ursine colobus, C. vellerosus
Mantled guereza or Abyssinian black-and-white colobus, C. guerezaFossil species
†Colobus flandrini†Colobus freedmaniBehaviour and ecology
Colobus habitats include primary and secondary forests, riverine forests, and wooded grasslands; they are found more in higher-density logged forests than in other primary forests. Their ruminant-like digestive systems have enabled them to occupy niches that are inaccessible to other primates: they are herbivorous, eating leaves, fruit, flowers, lichen, herbaceous vegetation and bark. Colobuses are important for seed dispersal through their sloppy eating habits, as well as through their digestive systems.

Leaf toughness influences colobus foraging efficiency. Tougher leaves correlate negatively with ingestion rate (g/min) as they are costly in terms of mastication, but positively with investment (chews/g). Individuals spend approximately 150 minutes actively feeding each day. In a montane habitat colobus are known to utilise lichen as a fallback food during periods of low food availability.

Social patterns and morphology
Colobuses live in territorial groups that vary in both size (3-15 individuals) and structure. It was originally believed that the structure of these groups consisted of one male and about 8 female members. However, more recent observations have shown variation in structure and the number of males within groups, with one species forming multi-male, multifemale groups in a multilevel society, and in some populations supergroups form exceeding 500 individuals. There appears to be a dominant male, whilst there is no clear dominance among female members. Relationships among females are considered to be resident-egalitarian, as there is low competition and aggression between them within their own groups. Juveniles are treated as a lower-rank (in regards to authority) than subadults and likewise when comparing subadults to adults. Colobuses do not display any type of seasonal breeding patterns.

As suggested by their name, adult colobi have black fur with white features. White fur surrounds their facial region and a "U" shape of long white fur runs along the sides of their body. Newborn colobi are completely white with a pink face. Cases of allomothering are documented, which means members of the troop other than the infant's biological mother care for it. Possible explanations to this are, increasing inclusive fitness or maternal practice which will benefit future offspring.

 Social behaviours 

Many members participate in a greeting ritual when they are reunited with familiar individuals, an act of reaffirming. The greeting behaviour is generally carried out by the approaching monkey and often is followed with grooming. They participate in three greeting behaviours of physical contact. This includes mounting, head mounting (grasps the shoulders) and embracing. It seems as though these behaviours do not have any relationship with mating or courting.Black-and-white colobus have complex sleeping patterns. They sleep in trees near a food source, which may serve to save energy. Groups seem to regularly switch up sleeping locations (suggested due to reducing risk of parasites and placement prediction) and generally do not sleep near other groups. They also tend to sleep more tightly together on nights with great visibility. They sleep in mid- to upper sections of tall trees which allows for predator watch as well as protection from ground and aerial predators while they are asleep. Although there is no obvious preference for tree type, they have often been observed in Antiaris toxicaria.''

Conservation
They are prey for many forest predators, and are threatened by hunting for the bushmeat trade, logging, and habitat destruction.

Individuals are more vigilant (conspecific threat) in low canopy, they also spend less time scanning when they are around familiar group members as opposed to unfamiliar. There are no clear difference in vigilance between male and females. However, there is a positive correlation between mean monthly vigilance and encounter rates. Male vigilance generally increases during mating.

References

External links

 Colobus Monkey: Wildlife summary from the African Wildlife Foundation
 Colobus Conservation
 Primate Info Net Colobus Factsheets
 Angolan Black & White Colobus

 
 
Folivores